is a city located in Fukuoka Prefecture, Japan. The city was founded on April 1, 1972.

As of January 31, 2012, the city has an estimated population of 59,296, with 22,059 households and a population density of 1,303.21 persons per km2. The total area is 45.50 km2.

It is bounded by Kurume to the south, Saga Prefecture to the east, Chikushino to the north, and Chikuzen, Tachiarai and what used to be Kitano to the west.

It has seven stations on the Nishitetsu Tenjin Ōmuta Line.

Attractions
Kyushu Historical Museum
Tanabata Shrine
Nyōirin Temple, also known as temple of the frog

Notable residents

 Maki Itoh - professional wrestler, idol
 Misa Eguchi - tennis player
 Masahiro Nakatani - baseball player
 Hikaru Naomoto - footballer
 Kazuyuki Hoashi - baseball player

References

External links

 

 
Cities in Fukuoka Prefecture